Gerda is a feminine given name. Notable people with the name include:

A
Gerda Ahlm (1869–1956), Swedish-born American painter and art conservator
Gerda Alexander (1908–1994), Danish teacher and therapist
Gerda Antti (born 1929), Swedish writer

B
Gerda Becker, Dutch table tennis player
Gerda Bengtsson (1900–1995), Danish textile artist
Gerda Blees (born 1985), Dutch writer
Gerda Blumenthal (1923–2004), German-American literary scholar
Gerda Boyesen (born 1922), Norwegian psychotherapist
Gerda Bredgaard (1908–1996), Danish swimmer
Gerda Bryłka (born 1941), Polish gymnast
Gerda Bülow, (1904–1990), Danish violinist

C
Gerda Charles, pseudonym of the British novelist Edna Lipson (1915–1996)
Gerda Christian (1913–1997), German private secretary of Adolf Hitler
Gerda Christophersen (1870–1947), Danish actress
Gerda Claeskens (fl. 2000s), Belgian statistician

D
Gerda Daumerlang (1920–2006), German diver
Gerda Dendooven (born 1962), Belgian illustrator

F
Gerda Fiil (1927–1994), Danish resistance fighter
Gerda Frömel (1931–1975), Czechoslovak-born Austrian sculptor

G
Gerda Gantz (born 1915), Romanian fencer
Gerda Gattel (1908–1993), American comic book author
Gerda Geertens (born 1955), Dutch composer
Gerda Gilboe (1914–2009), Danish actress and singer
Gerda Grepp (1907–1940), Norwegian writer and socialist

H
Gerda Hasselfeldt (born 1950), Bavarian politician
Gerda Hellberg (1870–1937), Swedish women's rights activist
Gerda Henning (1891–1951), Danish textile designer
Gerda Herrmann (1931–2021), German composer and poet
Gerda Hnatyshyn (born 1935), Canadian viceregal consort
Gerda Hofstätter (born 1971), Austrian billiards player
Gerda Höglund (1878–1973), Swedish painter
Gerda Höjer (1893–1974), Swedish nurse, recipient of the Florence Nightingale Medal and President of the International Council of Nurses
Gerda Holmes (1891–1943), Danish actress

J
Gerda Johansson (1891–1965), Swedish diver
Gerda Johner (born 1944), Swiss figure skater
Gerda-Maria Jürgens (1917–1998), German actress

K
Gerda van der Kade-Koudijs (1923–2015), Dutch sprinter and hurdler
Gerda Karstens (1903–1988), Danish ballet dancer
Gerda Kieninger (1951–2020), German politician
Gerda Kordemets (born 1960), Estonian theatre and film director, screenwriter, theatre critic, and journalist
Gerda Kraan (born 1933), Dutch middle-distance runner
Gerda Krüger-Nieland (1910–2000), German lawyer and senate president
Gerda Krūmiņa (born 1984), Latvian biathlete
Gerda Kupferschmied (born 1942), German athlete

L
Gerda Lammers (1915–1993), German soprano
Gerda Laski (1893–1928), Austrian/German physicist
Gerda Lassooij (born 1952), Dutch swimmer
Gerda Lerner (1920–2013), Austrian-born American historian and author
Gerda Lundequist (1871–1959), Swedish stage actress

M
Gerda Madsen (1902–1986), Danish film actress
Gerda Marcus (1880–1952), Swedish journalist and philanthropist
Gerda Martín (born 1927), Chilean athlete (javelin)
Gerda Maurus (1903–1968), Austrian actress
Gerda Mayer (born 1927), Czechoslovak-born English poet
Gerda Müller (1894–1951), German actress
Gerda Munsinger (1929–1998), East German prostitute and alleged Soviet spy

N
Gerda Nettesheim (1947–2011), German sound artist
Gerda Neumann (1915–1947), Danish film actress
Gerda Nicolson (1937–1992), Australian actress

O
Gerda Olsen (born 1932), Danish swimmer

P
Gerda Palm (1871–1949), Swedish painter
Gerda Pak (born 1993), Estonian swimmer
Gerda Paumgarten (1907–2000), Austrian alpine skier
Gerda Planting-Gyllenbåga (1878–1950), Swedish suffragist and social welfare expert

R
Gerda Ranz (born 1944), German runner
Gerda Rieser-Cegnar (fl. 1960s), Austrian luger
Gerda Ring (1891–1999), Norwegian-born stage actress and producer
Gerda Roosval-Kallstenius (1864–1939), Swedish painter
Gerda Roux (born 1973), South African archer
Gerda Rubinstein (born 1955), Dutch composer

S
Gerda Schriever (1928–2014), German contalto
Gerda Schmidt-Panknin (1920–2021), German painter
Gerda Sierens (born 1961), Belgian racing cyclist
Gerda Sprinchorn (1871–1951), Swedish sculptor and ceramist
Gerda Staniek (born 1925), Austrian athlete (javelin)
Gerda Steinhoff (1922–1946), Nazi SS concentration camp overseer hung for war crimes
Gerda Stevenson (born 1956), Scottish actress, director and writer
Gerda Steyn (born 1990), South African marathon athlete

T
Gerda Taro (1910–1937), German war photographer
Gerda Maria Terno (1909–1995), German actress
Gerda Tirén (1858–1928), Swedish artist

U
Gerda Uhlemann (born 1945), German athlete

V
Gerda Verburg (born 1957), Dutch diplomat, politician and trade union leader
Gerda Voitechovskaja (born 1991), Lithuanian badminton player
Gerda de Vries (fl. 2000s), Canadian mathematician

W
Gerda Wallander (1860–1926), Swedish painter
Gerda Wegener (1886–1940), Danish fine-artist, illustrator and painter
Gerda Weissensteiner (born 1969), Italian luger and bobsleigh pilot
Gerda Weissmann Klein (born 1924), Polish-born American writer and human rights activist 
Gerda Weltz (born 1951), Danish darts player
Gerda Wrede (1896–1967), Finnish actor and speech therapist

Fictional characters 
 Gerda, a character of Hans Christian Andersen's The Snow Queen and its adaptations
 Gerda, a character on the children's television show Sesamstraat
Gerda Christow, a character in Agatha Christie's novel The Hollow

Danish feminine given names
Dutch feminine given names
Estonian feminine given names
German feminine given names
Latvian feminine given names
Norwegian feminine given names
Swedish feminine given names